Gilles Azzopardi (20 March 1967 – 30 October 2020) was a French actor and theatre director.

Biography
The artistic career of Azzopardi started with music in 1995. He joined fellow musician Richard Larroze and formed a band called Azzo. They released an album titled IL =. In 1997, while the album was being mixed and edited, Azzopardi was offered an audition for the film Taxi by Luc Besson. Even though it was a small role, he advanced his career significantly. His next audition came for the film Le schpountz, although Azzopardi did not receive a role. However, his casters believed that he had a bright future ahead of him.

In 1998, Azzopardi began training at the Chocolat-Théâtre in Marseille. After three years, the theatre began allowing him to act in stage productions. He created his own theatre company called Les Spécimens. In multiple productions, he combined his talents in playwriting, directing, and acting.

Gilles Azzopardi died on 30 October 2020 at the age of 53 following a long illness.

Career

Theatre

Playwright, Director, and Actor
Hallucinémation (2001)
Masculin Plurielle (2002)
Château, scalpel et viande froide (2003)
Le grand chambardement (2004)
Les snipers de l'info (2005)
Buzz Off (2006)
Le Grand Cirque (2007)
Le grand chambardement (reprise) (2009–2011)
La chaise ou qui veut gagner des milliards ? (2010)
Don Facciomacco (2012)

Playwright and Director
Le béret de la tortue

Director
Le sens du ludique (2005)
L'Arapède (2005)
Poétique et névrotique (2007)
Un cacou et une cagole (2007)
L'œuf, la poule ou Nicole  (2010)

Actor
Théâtre sans animaux
Le dîner de cons

Filmography
Sous le soleil
Dock 13
Le Tuteur
Le Miroir de l'eau
Chante !
Paul Sauvage (2004)
Plus belle la vie (2006)
Enquêtes réservées (2009–2013)
Les Toqués (2010)
No Limit (2012)
Plus belle la vie (2018)

Awards
Director's Award and Interpretation Award for Buzz Off at the Festival de Gémenos (2006)
Prize for Best Comedy for Masculin Plurielle at the Festival FADA (2007)

References

1967 births
2020 deaths
French theatre directors
Male actors from Marseille